Suicide King is the third studio album by American heavy metal band King 810. Released on 25 January 2019, the work was published independently by the ensemble and produced by Josh Schroeder and David Gunn in Michigan.

Background 
In 2017–2018, drummer Andrew Workman, guitarist Andrew Beal and the band parted ways. In October 2018, the group released a music video for "Heartbeats", the first single off of the album.

Touring 
In November 2018, the ensemble performed at the Buick City Events Center. Following this performance, the quartet spent November and December in the United Kingdom with PUPPY.

Critical reception 
Neil Criddle of 'Dead Press stated that "Heartbeats" "sets things off perfectly, with a frenetically aggressive chorus with Gunn's lyrical pace intensifying, culminating in a real sense of urgency and vitality".

Stephen Hill of Louder Sound'' stated that "album closer "Sing Me to Sleep" has a dreamy, robotic nightmare vibe, "Wade in the Water addresses the Flint, Michigan water crisis using old blues and Tom Waits-esque dark crooning and album highlight "Black Rifle" is a piano-led ballad with a funeral stomp that recalls the gravel-voiced acoustic hip hop of Everlast".

Track listing

Personnel 
King 810
 David Gunn – vocals
 Eugene Gill – bass, guitars

References

King 810 albums
2019 albums